Kalana is a  village and seat of the commune of Gouandiaka in the Cercle of Yanfolila in the Sikasso Region of southern Mali. It is 44 km south of Yanfolila.

References

Populated places in Sikasso Region
Guinea–Mali border crossings